Ahmed Mohamed Yusuf, most commonly known as Ahmed Gacayte, was a famous Somali singer, songwriter and composer.

History 
Ahmed Gacayte was born in 1948 in a neighbourhood called Xidigta in Hargeisa, Somalia. He was the oldest of 10 sons and 3 daughters. He took the nickname of his father, Mohamed Yusuf "Gacayte".

In 1964, reporters from Radio Hargeysa came to his school to scout for potential singing talent and eventually recruited Gacayte.

In 1965, Gacayte recorded his first song "Ahlan wa sahlan Daahir", which was broadcast on Radio Hargeysa. In response, his father disowned him and kicked him out of his home.

Gacayte then started composing and writing more songs and plays like "Bood Xirsi" and "Siyar" with Amina Abdullahi. He soon became famous throughout the Somali world, especially throughout present day Somalia.

Personal life 
Gacayte was never married and eventually died in 1988 in Hargeisa at the age of 40, at the height of the Isaaq genocide.

Discography 

 Ilaah Baa Deeq Baxshee
 Umaleey Jacayl
 Orod orod
 Sabaalo
 Dulmiga
 Siyar (with Amina Abdullahi)
 Bood Xirsi (with Amina Abdullahi)
 Ahlan wa sahlan Daahir

References 

1948 births
1988 deaths
20th-century Somalian male singers